Dejonckheere is a surname. Notable people with the surname include:

 Godfried Dejonckheere (born 1952), Belgian race walker
 Noël Dejonckheere (1955–2022), Belgian cyclist
 Stijn Dejonckheere (born 1988), Belgian volleyball player

Surnames of Belgian origin